Central European University (CEU;) is a private research university accredited in Hungary, Austria, and the United States, with campuses in Vienna and Budapest. The university is known for its highly intensive programs in the social sciences and humanities, low student-faculty ratio, and international student body. A central tenet of the university's mission is the promotion of open societies, as a result of its close association with the Open Society Foundations. CEU is one of eight members comprising the CIVICA Alliance, a group of European higher education institutions in the social sciences, humanities, business management and public policy, such as Sciences Po (France), The London School of Economics and Political Science (UK), Bocconi University (Italy) and the Stockholm School of Economics (Sweden).

CEU was founded in 1991 by hedge fund manager, political activist, and billionaire philanthropist George Soros, who provided it with an $880 million endowment, making the university one of the wealthiest in Europe, especially on a per-student basis. The university was founded in Central Europe because of a perceived need for an independent and international university for the region, in light of the fall of the Socialist Bloc and concomitant democratisation.

The university is composed of 13 academic departments and 17 research centers, in addition to the School of Public Policy and the Doctoral School of Political Science, Public Policy and International Relations. CEU's alumni include notable politicians, academics, and activists, such as former President of Georgia, Giorgi Margvelashvili and Lívia Járóka, the first Romani woman ever elected to the European Parliament. CEU was the highest-ranked university in Hungary before it was forced to leave the country.

On 3 December 2018, CEU announced it would cease operations in Budapest and relocate to Vienna after the Hungarian government's refusal to sign an agreement allowing the university to continue operations in Hungary.
This withdrawal is the result of a long legal battle between the university and Viktor Orbán's government, and is set in the wider context of contemporary Hungarian politics. This situation has sparked discourse regarding academic freedom in Hungary, and spurred widespread protests in favour of CEU. On 6 October 2020, the European Court of Justice ruled that the "lex CEU" legislation, drawn up by the Hungarian government, was incompatible with European Union law.

History

History of the CEU, 1989–2017

CEU evolved from a series of lectures held at the IUC in Dubrovnik, Yugoslavia, (now Croatia). In the Spring of 1989, as historical change was gathering momentum in the region the need for a new, independent, international university was being considered. The minutes of the gathering held in April 1989 records a discussion among scholars such as Rudolf Andorka, Márton Tardos, István Teplán, Tibor Vámos and Miklós Vásárhelyi from Budapest, William Newton-Smith and Kathleen Wilkes from Oxford, Jan Havranek, Michal Illner and Jiří Kořalka from Prague, Krzysztof Michalski and Włodzimierz Siwiński from Warsaw. In 1989–1990, a serious attempt was undertaken to establish Central European University in the Slovak capital of Bratislava. But it fell through, due to nationalist politicians' opposition.

The university was founded in 1991 in response to the fall of the Socialist Bloc. The founding vision was to create a university dedicated to examining the contemporary challenges of "open societies" and democratization. The initial aim was to create a Western-modeled yet distinctly Central European institution that would foster inter-regional cooperation and educate a new corps of regional leaders to help usher in democratic transitions across the region. CEU was set up in Budapest, Prague, and Warsaw. It was originally located mostly in Prague, but because of "political and financial conflict between its founder and [the] Czech government," represented by then premier minister Vaclav Klaus, it was moved to Budapest.

In its second decade, CEU broadened its focus from regional to global, with a special emphasis on democracy promotion and human rights around the world. It has since developed a distinct academic approach, combining regional studies with an international perspective, emphasizing comparative and interdisciplinary research in order to generate new scholarship and policy initiatives, and to promote good governance and the rule of law. CEU has extended its outreach and financial aid programs to certain areas of the developing world.

CEU began the region's first master's degree programs in gender studies and environmental sciences.  The CEU Center for Media, Data and Society is the leading center of research on media, communication, and information policy in the region.

On 14 October 2007 George Soros stepped down as chairman of CEU Board. Leon Botstein (president of Bard College, New York), who had previously served as the vice-chair of the board, was elected as new chairman for a two-year term. George Soros is a Life-CEU trustee and serves as honorary chairman of the board.

On 1 August 2009 Rector Yehuda Elkana was succeeded by human rights leader and legal scholar John Shattuck. On 5 May 2016, it was announced that Michael Ignatieff would succeed Shattuck, becoming the fifth president and rector of the university. Ignatieff's inauguration took place at the university's new auditorium on 21 October 2017.

In June 2021, Ignatieff announced that he would be stepping down as president and rector of the university, and that Shalini Randeria would succeed him as the sixth rector and president. Randeria is the first woman to serve in this role at the university.

CEU and the Amendment to the National Higher Education law

Announcement and CEU's initial reactions 
On 28 March 2017, Hungarian Minister of Human Resources Zoltán Balog, also responsible for education, submitted a bill to Parliament to amend Act CCIV of 2011 on National Higher Education. The bill aims to introduce new regulations for foreign-operating universities, several of which affect CEU. Notably, such universities could only operate if the Hungarian government has an agreement with the university's other country of operation (concerning CEU, the agreement is between the State of New York and the city of Budapest). In addition, universities operating outside of the European Union should have a campus in their other country of operation, where comparable degree programs would be offered (in 2017 it was not the case for CEU). Furthermore, both existing and new non-EU academic staff would be required to apply for working permits. This requirement is seen by critics as placing CEU at a particular disadvantage, given that it relies largely on non-EU faculty. Finally, the law would also prohibit the American and Hungarian entities from sharing the same name.

CEU issued a statement expressing its opposition to the bill, noting that "these amendments [to Act CCIV of 2011 on National Higher Education] would make it impossible for the University to continue its operations as an institution of higher education in Budapest, CEU's home for 25 years", and that "CEU is in full conformity with Hungarian law."

The same day, the pro-government news website Origo.hu published an article asserting that CEU, to which it referred as "Soros University" (George Soros being its founder and main benefactor, and also known as an opponent of Prime Minister Viktor Orbán and his Fidesz party), operated unlawfully in Hungary, citing regulatory infractions. The article also referred to a report prepared by Hungary's Educational Authority, which revealed that 28 universities, including CEU, were being investigated for operating unlawfully in Hungary. CEU issued a statement in response to the article, claiming the allegations of cheating and regulatory infractions constituted defamations and libel, and threatened to sue the website if the article was not corrected.

On 29 March 2017, Michael Ignatieff, the President and Rector of CEU and Pro-Rector for Hungarian Affairs Zsolt Enyedi and Pro-Rector for Social Sciences and Humanities Éva Fodor held a press conference. Ignatieff said, among other things, that "the legislation tabled by the Hungarian government relating to higher education is targeted and discriminatory, attacks the CEU, and is an unacceptable assault on our academic freedom", and "the academic freedom of Hungarian higher education in general". Later, Ignatieff and Enyedi met Secretary of State for Education László Palkovics. CEU issued a statement thereafter, calling "for the government to withdraw this legislation and enter into negotiations to find a solution."

On 31 March 2017, Viktor Orbán stated in an interview to public radio that the future of "Soros University" (referring to George Soros, founder and main benefactor of CEU) depended on US-Hungarian talks. He said that CEU was "cheating" by awarding both Hungarian and American degrees, despite not operating abroad. This was a breach of Hungarian regulations, which gave an unfair advantage to CEU over the other 21 foreign universities in Hungary. In response to those claims, CEU issued a statement rejecting the suggestion that it was cheating and in breach of Hungarian regulations. Indeed, according to CEU, no laws in effect required universities such as CEU to also operate in their countries of origin. However, Szilard Nemeth, vice chairman of Fidesz was more blunt, stating that civil society groups with funding from Soros should be "swept out" of Hungary.

Media reactions 
According to Marc Santora of The New York Times, "Mr. Orban has long viewed the school as a bastion of liberalism, presenting a threat to his vision of creating an 'illiberal democracy,' and his desire to shut it down was only deepened by its association with Mr. Soros, a philanthropist who was born in Hungary. [He] has spent years demonizing Mr. Soros, a Jew who survived the Nazi occupation of Hungary, accusing him of seeking to destroy European civilization by promoting illegal immigration, and often tapping into anti-Semitic tropes."

Zack Beauchamp of Vox wrote that "The university was a casualty of Prime Minister Viktor Orbán’s turn toward authoritarianism, his development of a quietly repressive system that I’ve termed 'soft fascism'. CEU, a university dedicated to liberal principles and founded by Hungarian-American billionaire George Soros, posed a threat to Orbán's ideological project. So he put in place a set of characteristically sneaky regulations aimed at forcing out CEU without needing to formally ban them, eventually crushing the university's ability to operate."

Griff Witte of The Washington Post commented that "[CEU] has become the prime target of Orban's campaign to dismantle Europe's multicultural, tolerant liberalism and cement a culture that is unapologetically Christian, conservative and nationalist."

Author Tibor Fischer expressed his support for the legislation passed on the initiative of Prime Minister Viktor Orbán's government, which affects CEU as well as all other Hungarian universities. Fischer defended Orban against "charges of antisemitism", indicating that the government "introduced Holocaust education into schools, passed a Holocaust denial law and...financed Son of Saul, a film about Auschwitz that [went on to win] an Oscar." He specified that he opposes the practice whereby the CEU, being registered in New York City, can issue a diploma accredited in the United States but without actually operating a campus in America within the provisions of the law as every other Hungarian campus, a situation that he named as CEU students "getting a double bubble."

Expressions of support for CEU 
On the same day, the United States government (Trump administration) released a statement expressing concern about the proposed legislation, which would "negatively affect or even lead to the closure of Central European University (CEU) in Budapest", and urging the Hungarian government not to take "any legislative action that would compromise CEU's operations or independence."

Hungary's ombudsman for educational rights Lajos Aary-Tamas called the amendment to the Higher Education Law "discriminatory against CEU", and said that during his 17 years in office he had never received any complaint about CEU's legal status. Hungarian EU Commissioner for Education, Culture, Multilingualism and Youth Tibor Navracsics, and former President of Hungary László Sólyom also expressed support.

Academics and academic institutions from Hungary, Latvia, Poland, Russia, Romania, Germany, the Netherlands, the United Kingdom, the United States, and other countries have expressed support for CEU. CEU itself has started a campaign of support, with the slogans #aCEUvalvagyok Central European University in Hungarian and #IstandwithCEU Central European University in English. The campaign uses social media to call on supporters to express their solidarity to CEU and write to Hungarian representatives.

2017 Protests in Hungary were held on April 2 in the form of a walk from Budapest's Corvinus University to Parliament, passing by Eötvös Loránd University and CEU. The demonstration brought together thousands of protesters according to Reuters, with protest speeches held by both CEU and foreign academics and activists, and was broadcast live on Facebook by Hír TV.

In the wake of the new Hungarian legislation, the Czech minister of Finance Andrej Babiš proposed the CEU be moved to Prague, Czech Republic, offering particular buildings in the centre of the city that the university might use.

Legal action by CEU and acceleration of the legislative procedure 
On 3 April 2017, CEU submitted a legal memorandum to the Hungarian Parliament, raising substantial issues about the legality and constitutionality of the proposed amendment to Act CCIV of 2011 on national higher education, and pledged to continue to contest this law using all available legal means in Hungary and in the EU.

On the same day, the Hungarian parliament decided to debate and vote on the draft bill the following day, after a request by Deputy Prime Minister Zsolt Semjén, also head of the Christian Democrats, the junior party in the government coalition. Semjén said his request was justified by "government interests to pass the law early."

Withdrawal from Hungary and government reaction 
On 3 December 2018 the university announced it would relocate the majority of its operations to Vienna in September 2019, after the Hungarian government's refusal to sign an agreement allowing it to continue teaching its US-accredited programs in Hungary. Less than one fifth of CEU's programs, that are locally accredited, would remain in Budapest. "The university retains accreditation as a Hungarian university and has sought to continue teaching and research activity in Budapest as long as possible, with current students completing their studies in Budapest.

After failing to promote a deal between the US and Hungary that would keep the CEU in Budapest, US Ambassador to Hungary, David Cornstein, an appointee of the Trump Administration, said on 30 November that the whole issue "had to do with [Orban and Soros]. It had nothing to do with academic freedom or civil liberties".

Academics
As of 2019, 1217 students were enrolled in the university, of which 962 were international students, making the student body the fourth most international in the world. CEU offers doctoral programmes in thirteen different subjects and master's programmes in thirty-seven different subjects, in addition to three interdisciplinary bachelor's programmes. All programmes at CEU have a heavy research focus, and all courses are delivered in small, seminar-style classes, emphasising the low student-faculty ratio.

Rankings

Until the 2019–2020 academic year, CEU was exclusively a postgraduate university and therefore not eligible for general world university rankings. However, two new bachelor's degree programs were introduced in the 2020–2021 academic year and this should soon be reflected in new ranking tables.
Regardless of this limitation due to the intentionally small size and specialised nature of the university, CEU has consistently performed well in subject rankings produced by various publishers.

The Economics department of the university was recently ranked eighth in Europe by the European Research Council (ERC), based on research excellence.

CEU's Department of Legal Studies was ranked first in Central Europe by the Czech newspaper, Lidové noviny. The survey included Austrian, Czech, German, Hungarian, Polish, and Slovak universities.

Of the three that came to Hungary two were awarded to CEU faculty.

Accreditation
CEU is organized as an American-style institution, governed by a board of trustees, with a charter from the Board of Regents of the University of the State of New York, for and on behalf of the New York State Education Department. In the United States, CEU is accredited by the Middle States Commission on Higher Education. In Hungary, CEU is officially recognized as a privately maintained and operated university. The university was accredited by the Hungarian Accreditation Committee in 2004.
In Austria, CEU is recognized as a private higher education institution, pursuant to section 7 of the Decree on Accreditation of Private Universities (PU-AkkVO). Central European University Private University (CEU PU) is accredited by the Agency for Quality Assurance and Accreditation Austria.

CEU Library and OSA

The CEU Library has a large English-language print collection of more than 150,000 documents and over 50,000 e-journals and 200,000 e-books,

The Blinken Open Society Archives at CEU (OSA) is a Cold War research facility, holding over 7,500 linear meters of material, 11,000 hours of audiovisual recordings and 12 terabytes of data related to communist-era political, social, economic and cultural life. OSA's collection includes an extensive archive of Radio Free Europe/Radio Liberty transcripts and reports, along with a large collection of underground samizdat literature and materials from Central and Eastern Europe under communism. The archive also houses a growing collection of documents and audiovisual materials on international human rights and war crimes.

CEU Press 
CEU Press is the largest English-language publisher in Central and Eastern Europe. Since its founding in 1993, it has played an important role in publishing books on the economic, social, and political transformation of the region, including titles by Hungarians or on Hungarian themes. Four of its top-10 best-selling books worldwide are related to Hungary.

Alumni and faculty

Alumni
Since Its inception, 16,795 students from 147 countries have graduated from CEU, the majority of whom went on to be employed in business, education, research, or government.

Among the university's alumni in law and government are the former President of Georgia, Giorgi Margvelashvili as well as Members of the European Parliament Lívia Járóka and Monica Macovei, former Georgian Minister of Defense Tinatin Khidasheli, chairman of the Slovakian Party of the Hungarian Coalition József Berényi, imprisoned Azerbaijani politician Ilgar Mammadov, and former Croatian Minister of Justice Orsat Miljenic. The international spokesman of the Hungarian government, Zoltán Kovács, is also an alumnus of CEU.

Central European University has also produced academics in the social sciences, environmental sciences, and humanities. Jaroslav Miller, professor of history and rector at Palacký University is an alumnus, as are political scientist Tomasz Kamusella, historian of religions Andrei Oișteanu, and vice-president of the Polish Academy of the Sciences Paweł Rowiński.

The university also has alumni in the fields of art and activism, including Azerbaijani dissident Rashadat Akhundov and filmmaker Dylan Mohan Gray.

Notable current or former academic staff

See also
 Open access in Hungary
 Viktor Orbán
 Fidesz
 Open Society
 Politics of Hungary
 George Soros

Notes

Further reading

External links
Central European University
CEU Executive MBA
Notable alumni of Central European University

 
1991 establishments in Czechoslovakia
George Soros
Educational institutions established in 1991
Multinational universities and colleges